Moffat Academy is a school in Moffat, Dumfries and Galloway, Scotland. It educates children from nursery to Secondary 6.

History
Moffat Academy traces its history to the local grammar school founded in 1639 by Dr Johnstone. During the 1810s, the school entered a low period as there were suspicions that the funds endowed by Johnstone's estate were misused. It then merged with a local parish school in 1834 and named "Moffat Academy". Until the construction of new premises beginning in 2007, the school was housed on the same site for over 150 years. In 1988, fifth and sixth year classes were added, meaning pupils could now attend the school all the way to age 18. Prior to this students staying on after fourth year had to travel south to Lockerbie Academy to complete fifth and sixth years. The academy moved to its new premises in 2010.

References

External links
Official site

Secondary schools in Dumfries and Galloway
1834 establishments in Scotland
Moffat